Sook Kalan is a village situated near Beowali in the district of Gujrat, Pakistan. It is about 5 kilometers in the north of Gujrat.

Villages in Gujrat District